Palizzi is a comune (municipality) in the Province of Reggio Calabria in the Italian region Calabria, located about  southwest of Catanzaro and about  southeast of Reggio Calabria. The southernmost point in mainland Italy lies in Palizzi.

It is one of the Greek (Griko dialect) speaking villages of Bovesia one of the two Griko-speaking areas of southern Italy.

Palizzi borders the following municipalities: Bova, Bova Marina, Brancaleone, Staiti.

See also
Calabrian wine
Capo Spartivento Calabro Lighthouse

References

External links
 Comunedipalizzi.it/

Cities and towns in Calabria